Luis Altamirano Talavera (July 5, 1867 – July 25, 1938) was a Chilean military officer, minister, Vice President of the Republic and finally president of the Government Junta of Chile between 1924 and 1925.

He was born in Concepción on the son of Eulogio Altamirano Araceda and Antonia Adelina Talavera Appleby. He studied law and started a career in the ministry of Justice. During the 1891 Chilean Civil War, he joined the congressional army as an artillery captain. He was a lieutenant colonel by the end of it, a year later. After the end of revolution he left the army, only to return in 1897.  The year after, he was named commander of Regiment Nº3 of artillery. In 1908 was promoted to full colonel, and named Under-Chief of General staff. In 1911, he was sent as military attaché to the Chilean embassy in Berlin. In 1912, was promoted to brigadier general, and named Inspector General of artillery, and Army Chief of staff. In 1919 was promoted to division general, and named commander of the II Division. In 1922, was named army inspector general, the highest position in the army at the time. As such he was in charge of the Chilean delegation to the swearing-in of a new president of Argentina. That year he also was named Minister of War and Navy, by President Arturo Alessandri.

On September 5, 1924, and as a consequence of the episode known as the Ruido de sables, a group of young military officers, led by Colonel Marmaduque Grove and Major Carlos Ibáñez del Campo, demanded of President Arturo Alessandri the dismissal of three of his ministers, including the minister of War; the enactment of a labor code, the passage of an income tax law, and the improvement of the military salaries. Alessandri had no option but to appoint General Altamirano, then head of the army, as interior minister to head a new cabinet. On September 8, General Altamirano appeared in front of Congress to demand the passage of eight laws, including Alessandri's labor code and the income tax proposal. Congress didn't dare to protest, and the laws were passed in a matter of hours.

At that point, Alessandri felt that he had become just a pawn of the military and on September 9, he resigned, and requested asylum at the US Embassy. General Altamirano became vice president (a position reserved, in the absence of a president, to the interior minister, according to the Chilean constitution.) Congress refused to accept Alessandri's resignation, and instead granted him a six-month constitutional leave of absence. Alessandri left the country immediately for Italy.

On September 11, General Altamirano established a military Junta to rule the country, together with Vice-Admiral Francisco Nef and General Juan Pablo Bennett, retaining the position of president. He assumed dictatorial powers and proceeded to close Congress. During his conservative rule, he tried several measures to control the economic crisis and to reform the local bureaucracy. Nonetheless, he lost the confidence of the "military committee" who had elevated him to power, and was deposed and arrested by another military coup on January 23, 1925. On February 6, 1925, he retired from active duty and died in Santiago in 1938.

External links
 Official biography  

1867 births
1938 deaths
Chilean Ministers of the Interior
Chilean Ministers of Defense
Heads of state of Chile
Leaders who took power by coup
Chilean Army generals